A know-it-all is a person who appears to offers expert opinion, without possessing it.

Know-it-all or know-all may also refer to:

Books
 The Know-It-All, a 2004 book by A.J. Jacobs
 "Doctor Know-all", a German fairy tale

Film and TV
 "Know All", an episode of Round the Twist, an Australian children's TV series
 Knowitalls, a 2009 British quiz show
 Mister Know-It-All, an American animated web series
 Mr. Know-It-All, a segment of the American Rocky and Bullwinkle TV cartoon

Music
 Know-It-All, a 2015 album by Alessia Cara
 "Mr. Know It All", a 2011 single by Kelly Clarkson
 "He's Misstra Know-It-All", a 1974 Stevie Wonder song

See also
 Canada's Greatest Know-It-All, a 2012 Canadian reality television series
 Like You Know It All, a 2009 South Korean comedy-drama
 Please Kill Mr. Know It All, a 2013 Canadian romantic comedy film